Bionaz  (from 1939 to 1946) is a comune sparso which extends over  of the North-Eastern Valpelline area of the Aosta Valley region of northwest Italy. The commune lies on the left side of the river Dora Baltea. The population of about 240 is dispersed among 20 or more small alpine villages and hamlets including Plan-de-Veyne, which is the main centre and the capoluogo (locally and officially also chef-lieu, in French). The commune belongs to the Unité des communes valdôtaines du Grand-Combin.

Villages, hamlets and other centres

The commune's statute designates the following frazioni (locally officially called hameaux, in French):
Les Balmes
Chentre
Chez-Chenoux
Chez-Noyer
Chez-les-Merloz
Les Crêtes
Les Dzovennoz
Lexert
Les Ley
Le Moulin
Plan-de-Veyne
Perquis
Les Places
Pouillayes
La Quelod
Les Rey
Les Rus (Ru)
Les Vagère
Le Vianoz

The following localities, villages and other places not formally designated as frazioni, are also listed in the bulletin:
Chamein
Chez-Badin
Le Clos-Neuf
La Ferrère
La Léchère
Prarayer
Propéraz

Mountain huts 
Within the boundaries of the commune, there are also three mountain huts:
 Refuge Crête Sèche
 Refuge Prarayer
 Refuge Aoste
 Refuge Nacamuli au col Collon

Notes

References

External links
 

Cities and towns in Aosta Valley